Solidago wrightii, commonly known as Wright's goldenrod, is a North American species of goldenrod in the family Asteraceae. It grows in northern Mexico (Chihuahua, Durango, Sonora, Coahuila) and the southwestern United States (Arizona, New Mexico, Colorado, western Texas, and the Oklahoma Panhandle).

Solidago wrightii is a perennial herb up to 110 cm (44 inches) tall, with a woody underground caudex and rhizomes. One plant can produce as many as 140 small yellow flower heads in a large, rounded array at the top of the plant.

References

External links
Photo of herbarium specimen collected in Coahuila in 1981
Vascular Plants of the Gila Wilderness
Rocky Mountain Flora photos of several species including Solidago wrightii

wrightii
Plants described in 1880
Flora of the United States
Flora of Mexico